Jain Kumar (born 1959) is a Fijian civil servant and former politician of Indian descent. He was elected the Chairman of Sugar Cane Growers Council of Fiji on 19 January 2007. He replaced Vijendra Autar who had been sacked by the military together with Jagannath Sami and eight board members appointed by the deposed government.

Kumar was previously the Vice Chairman of the Council and is the President of  the National Farmers Union.  He was elected to the House of Representatives in the 2006 elections from the Ba East Indian Communal Constituency on the Fiji Labour Party ticket.

References 

Indian members of the House of Representatives (Fiji)
Fijian Hindus
Fiji sugar industry
Fijian trade unionists
1959 births
Living people
Fiji Labour Party politicians
Fijian civil servants
Politicians from Ba Province